John George Alexander Baird (1854–1917) was Unionist MP for Glasgow Central.

Baird was educated at Eton and Christ Church, Oxford.

He first stood for the seat in 1885, won it in 1886, but lost it narrowly in 1906.

Baird served as a lieutenant of the 16th Lancers. He was later Lieutenant-colonel of the Ayrshire (Earl of Carrick's Own) Imperial Yeomanry.

References

External links 

1854 births
1917 deaths
Members of the Parliament of the United Kingdom for Glasgow constituencies
UK MPs 1886–1892
UK MPs 1892–1895
UK MPs 1895–1900
UK MPs 1900–1906
Scottish Tory MPs (pre-1912)
Ayrshire (Earl of Carrick's Own) Yeomanry officers
People educated at Eton College
Alumni of Christ Church, Oxford